Eclogavena is a genus of sea snails, marine gastropod mollusks in the family Cypraeidae, the cowries.

Species
Species within the genus Eclogavena include:
Eclogavena coxeni (Cox, 1873)
Eclogavena dani (Beals, 2002)
Eclogavena dayritiana (Cate, 1963)
 Eclogavena hesperina (Schilder & Summers, 1963)
Eclogavena luchuana (Kuroda, 1960)
Eclogavena quadrimaculata (Gray, 1824)
 Eclogavena steineri (C. N. Cate, 1969)

References

 Schilder, M. & Schilder, F. A. (1971) A catalogue of living and fossil cowries. A taxonomy and bibliography of Triviacea and Cypraeacea (Gastropoda Prosobranchia). Institut Royal des Sciences Naturelles de Belgique, Mémoires, Deuxième Series, 85: 1-246

External links
 Iredale, T. (1930). Queensland molluscan notes, No. 2. Memoirs of the Queensland Museum. 10(1): 73-88, pl. 9

Cypraeidae